Acrolepia autumnitella is a species of moth of the family Acrolepiidae. It is found in most parts of Europe. The wingspan ranges from 11 to 13 mm. The forewings are less elongate [than in Digitivalva granitella], ochreous - brown to dark fuscous, irregularly strigulated with black and whitish; two blackish costal spots near middle; a triangular dorsal spot of whitish strigulae before middle; a black sinuate streak in disc towards apex; a whitish bar in middle of terminal cilia. Hindwings are dark grey, lighter anteriorly. The larva is whitish-green; head brownish,

References

External links
 
 
 bladmineerders.nl
 UKmoths

Acrolepiidae
Moths of Europe
Moths described in 1838
Taxa named by John Curtis